Bøylestad Station is a railway station in the village of Bøylestad in Froland municipality in Agder county, Norway. Located on the Arendal Line, it is served by the Go-Ahead Norge. The station was opened in 1910 as part of Arendal–Åmli Line.  The rural station has no services such as food or bathrooms.

References

Railway stations in Agder
Railway stations on the Arendal Line
Railway stations opened in 1910
1910 establishments in Norway
Froland